James Samuel Pilafian (October 25, 1949 – April 5, 2019) was an American tuba player and educator.

Biography 
Pilafian participated in the National Music Camp in Interlochen, MI and was the second tuba player to win the concerto competition. Via his performance at Interlochen, he was awarded scholarships to study at both Dartmouth College and the Tanglewood Music Center. Leonard Bernstein chose Pilafian to perform in the world premier of Bernstein's Mass at the opening of the John F. Kennedy Center for the Performing Arts. He earned his bachelor's degree in music at the University of Miami in 1972.

Since then, Pilafian performed numerous times in international concerts and recordings. He founded the Empire Brass and performed in the Broadway Musicals Doctor Jazz and Much Ado About Nothing. He also played with Boston Brass from 2013–2019

Pilafian was also active in the jazz scene, having played with the Duke Ellington Orchestra and, since 1991, in the duo Travelin' Light with guitarist Frank Vignola. With the saxophonist Scott Zimmer, Pilafian also played the music of Maurice Ravel, Béla Bartók, Thelonious Monk, Ornette Coleman, and Captain Beefheart. Pilafian also participated in a Pink Floyd recording.

In 1985 Pilafian was on the Mr. Rogers' Neighborhood television show Episode 1549, where he demonstrated the tuba and Fred Rogers attempted to buzz a note.  Dave Ohanian, Rolf Smedvig, Charles Lewis Jr., and Scott Hartman, all members of the Empire Brass at the time, also make appearances in this episode.      

In the early 2000's, Pilafian teamed up with Patrick Sheridan to develop and publish The Breathing Gym, a book/DVD resource that teaches stretching and breathing exercises to promote free breathing and efficient use of air. The Breathing Gym method is deeply rooted in Pilafian and Sheridan's experience with Arnold Jacobs.  

Pilafian started teaching at Arizona State University in 1994 and later at University of Miami in 2012 and North Dakota State University in 2017. Among his notable students is Marcus Rojas.

Pilafian died on April 5, 2019 from complications related to Colon Cancer

Discography 
 Travelling Light, Telarc, 1991
 Making Whoopee, 1993
 Meltdown, 1998
 Perception, 1998 mit Eugene Anderson, Timothy Russell, Timothy Morrison und dem Arizona State University Symphony Orchestra
 Rewired, 2015, Boston Brass
 Reminiscing, 2016, Boston Brass
 Simple Gifts, 2018. Boston Brass

References

External links
 

American tubists
Musicians from Miami
Dartmouth College alumni
Arizona State University faculty
North Dakota State University faculty
University of Miami Frost School of Music alumni
1949 births
2019 deaths
American people of Armenian descent
20th-century tubists
21st-century tubists
University of Miami faculty